Jhonlen Cruz Barreto Peña (born ) is a Venezuelan male volleyball player. He is part of the Venezuela men's national volleyball team.

References

1987 births
Living people
Venezuelan men's volleyball players
Place of birth missing (living people)